Hang-On GP is a racing video game developed by Genki and published by Sega for the Sega Saturn. It is the latest game in the Hang-On series.

Gameplay
Hang-On GP is motorcycle racing game.

Reception
Next Generation reviewed the Saturn version of the game, rating it three stars out of five, and stated that "Hang On GP '95 is a better than average racer, but the title lacks the inspired nature of a great game".

Reviews
Edge #28
Electronic Gaming Monthly (Mar, 1996)
GamePro (Apr, 1996)
GameFan Magazine - Jan, 1996
Mean Machines - Apr, 1996
Game Revolution - Jun 06, 2004

See also
Super Hang-On

Notes

References

External links 
 Hang-On GP at GameFAQs
 Hang-On GP at MobyGames

1995 video games
Racing video games
Sega video games
Sega Saturn games
Sega Saturn-only games
Video games developed in Japan